Mound is an unincorporated community in Coryell County, Texas, United States. Although Mound is unincorporated, it has a post office, with the ZIP code of 76558.

Mound was settled early in the 1850s, before most other communities in Coryell County; it did not receive a railroad line until 1882 or a post office until 1884. Although Mound was long a center of education (it was named for the local White Mound School), in 1971 its schools were merged into the Gatesville Independent School District. Today, FM 1829 passes through Mound.

As Of 2020, the Population Of Mound, TX is 174.

References

External links
2020 Census Results For Mound, Tx
https://www.census.gov/search-results.html?searchType=web&cssp=SERP&q=Mound%20CDP,%20Texas

Unincorporated communities in Coryell County, Texas
Unincorporated communities in Texas